Anthony Sclafani (born 1944) is an American neuroscientist, currently a Distinguished Professor at City University of New York.

References 

City University of New York faculty
American neuroscientists
1944 births
Living people